Neotrachys is a genus of beetles in the family Buprestidae, the jewel beetles. These are Neotropical beetles, and many are known to use ferns as their host plants.

Species include:

 Neotrachys amazonicus (Kerremans, 1896)
 Neotrachys andrewsi Hespenheide, 2006
 Neotrachys araguensis Cobos, 1978
 Neotrachys bellamyi Hespenheide, 2006
 Neotrachys bicolor Hespenheide, 1982
 Neotrachys bilyi Hespenheide, 1990
 Neotrachys bolivianus (Kerremans, 1897)
 Neotrachys bordoni Cobos, 1978
 Neotrachys caeruleus Hespenheide, 1982
 Neotrachys caracaensis Cobos, 1978
 Neotrachys chiriquiensis Hespenheide, 2006
 Neotrachys concinnus (Fisher, 1922)
 Neotrachys cupeyali (Zayas, 1988)
 Neotrachys cuprascens Hespenheide, 2006
 Neotrachys cyanea (Zayas, 1988)
 Neotrachys dominicanus Thery, 1947
 Neotrachys estebanus (Kerremans, 1896)
 Neotrachys falconensis Cobos, 1978
 Neotrachys fennahi Thery, 1940
 Neotrachys gleicheniae Hespenheide, 1982
 Neotrachys guadeloupensis (Fleutiaux & Salle, 1890)
 Neotrachys hoffmani Fisher, 1930
 Neotrachys jakovlevi Obenberger, 1932
 Neotrachys mariae Hespenheide, 2006
 Neotrachys nelsoni Hespenheide, 2006
 Neotrachys panamaensis (Fisher, 1924)
 Neotrachys refulgens Hespenheide, 2006
 Neotrachys resplendens Hespenheide, 1982
 Neotrachys segregatus (Waterhouse, 1889)
 Neotrachys solisi Hespenheide, 2006
 Neotrachys strandi Obenberger, 1923
 Neotrachys wittmeri Cobos, 1959

References

Further reading
Hespenheide, H. A. (1980). A revision of Antillean Neotrachys (Coleoptera, Buprestidae). Journal of the Kansas Entomological Society 53(4) 815–24.
Hespenheide, H. A. (2006). New species and new records of Neotrachys Obenberger, 1923, from Central America and the Antilles (Coleoptera: Buprestidae). The Pan-Pacific Entomologist 82(2) 223–41.

Buprestidae genera